
The L'Art de Vivre (The Art of Living) was built in 1917 in Deptford, England, as a cargo barge but currently serves as a luxury hotel barge owned and operated by European Waterways. She is one of around 60 hotel barges operating on European waterways, mostly on the smaller French canals.

History
Originally christened as Marie Brizzard, her purpose was to ferry ammunition to the beaches of Normandy to help the Allies fighting in the Somme. She was built particularly strong to resist the English Channel's harsh weather conditions and groundings on a Normandy beach. After the end of World War II, she was moved round the north and west coasts of France and into the River Charente estuary to Rochefort. Here, she delivered barrels of cognac from Angoulême to Rochefort. She was renamed Cognac, Royal Cognac, Napoleon, Mark Twain, Magellan, and Kir Royal.

In 1975 she was converted into a hotel barge by Florian Waleski, who operated the hotel barge until 1997, when she was purchased by European Waterways. After an interior refit of the cabins and galley, L'Art de Vivre was for the next 10 years the only hotel barge to navigate the shallow reaches of the upper Nivernais Canal in Burgundy. In 2008 she underwent a third refit and over $200,000 was invested in four new cabins.

Amenities
L'Art de Vivre has four double cabins allowing her to carry up to eight passengers. She also has separate crew quarters which house the crew of four people. The crew consists of the captain and pilot, deck hand, and tour guide, housekeeper, and master chef.

References

External links 
 L'Art de Vivre on the owner's website

Hotel barges
Barges of France
Barges
Hotels in France
1917 ships